Francis Smith Sampson (November 1, 1814 – April 9, 1854) was an acting President of Hampden–Sydney College from 1847 to 1848.

Biography
Sampson was born in Dover Mills, Virginia to Richard Sampson, an eminent and respected agriculturist. He began studying theology in 1830 under his maternal uncle, Rev. Thornton Rogers of Albemarle. Sampson continued his studies at the University of Virginia, enrolling on September 10, 1831, and graduating with the rare, prestigious degree of M.A. in July 1836. In November of that year, Sampson enrolled at the Union Theological Seminary then in Hampden Sydney, Virginia where he became a teacher of Hebrew in 1838 and licensed by the East Hanover Presbytery in October 1839, and ordained by the same Presbytery in October 1941.

Sampson was appointed as the Acting President of Hampden–Sydney College at the end of 1847 and served in that role until September 1848 when Charles Martin replaced him. In July 1848, Sampson traveled to Europe to develop and practice his theology, returning in August 1849, having spent the year primarily at the University of Halle and University of Berlin. In October 1848, he was elected professor of oriental literature and languages in the Seminary and soon thereafter received his honorary Doctorate of Divinity from Hampden–Sydney College.

References

1814 births
1854 deaths
Presidents of Hampden–Sydney College
Presbyterian Church in the United States of America ministers
People from Goochland County, Virginia
19th-century American clergy